Centauropsis is a genus of flowering plants in the daisy family.

 Species
All the known species are endemic to Madagascar.

References

Vernonieae
Asteraceae genera
Endemic flora of Madagascar
Taxa named by Wenceslas Bojer
Taxa named by Augustin Pyramus de Candolle